Vladislav Šarišský (born 25 September 1984, Košice, Slovakia) is a Slovak composer.

Šarišský studied at the conservatoire in Košice from 1999 to 2004, where his teachers included Norbert Bodnár. He later studied with Evgeni Irshai. In 2012 he was a Laureate of the Sergei Prokofiev International Composers' Competition in St. Petersburg for his flute concerto, EFieL.

His compositions include chamber music and orchestral music. Amongst his works are a piano concerto (DOR, 2003) and four string quartets.

Notes

21st-century composers
Musicians from Košice
Living people
1984 births
Slovak composers
Male composers
Slovak male musicians